Marcel André Marie Riffard (30 November 1886 – 9 July 1981) was a French aeronautical engineer. Over the course of his career he worked for several French aircraft companies, including a stint in the 1930s as chief designer for Caudron-Renault, an aircraft subsidiary of Renault. His aircraft designs included fighter planes and successful air racers, as well as planes for postal delivery and medical transport. He also designed racing cars and land-speed record cars for Panhard and Renault. He has been called the "Father of modern aviation".

Early years
On 14 July 1883, French engineer Edmond Riffard arrived in Argentina with his wife Gabrielle Guy de Riffard and their son Pablo. The family settled in Villa Ocampo, Santa Fe Province. Edmond had moved to Argentina to build the Tacuarendí sugar mill, but he also introduced both the telephone and paper money to the country. He would also partner with Frenchman George Brosset to establish the French Chaco Distillery. While in Argentina two more children were born to the family; Irma, in 1885, and Marcel, on 30 November 1886. One year after the Baring crisis of 1890, the family returned to France, arriving in 14 July 1893. Eventually there would be five children in the family.

Riffard attended school at the Lycée J.B. Dumas in Alès. During the mathematics portion of the 1903 Concours général, he provided seven solutions to a problem for which Henri Poincaré had only given five. For this he won the Grande Médaille d'Argent, the Prix de la Société Scientifique et Littéraire, and the Premier Prix au Concours Généraux, Section Mathématiques. He also pursued athletics, going to Paris in July 1905 for the Critérium Interscolaire d'Athlétisme, where he finished third.

Riffard studied in preparation for admission to l'École nationale supérieure des mines de Saint-Étienne at the Lycée Carnot in the city of Saint-Étienne but did not pursue a Grande École. Instead he worked for tire manufacturer La Société des Pneumatiques Samson from October 1905 to October 1907. From 10 October 1907 until 28 September 1909 Riffard performed his national military service as part of the 38th field artillery regiment, assigned to the 7th battery detachment in Bastia, Corsica.

Aviation

 In 1909, Riffard developed a scale model of an electrically controlled variable-pitch propeller.
 In 1910, working with aviators Robert Martinet and Georges Legagneux, he designed the first all-metal aircraft.
 In 1912 he produced the first medical aircraft. In the process, he invented an anti-icing device and a thermoregulator flap for water-cooled engines.
 In 1917 he headed the Breguet Aviation design office, then between 1923 and 1926, he directed the technical management of Monge, and from 1926 to 1930 he headed the Clichy design office of the Société de Constructions Aéronautiques d'hydravions Lioré et Olivier, where he designed several flying boats.
 From 1932 to 1940 he worked for Caudron-Renault, where he designed the "Rafale" and the "Simoun" which distinguished themselves in particular in the Coupe Deutsch de la Meurthe, as well as other aircraft including the Caudron C.690. During this period Riffard reports directly to François Lehideux, head of Renault at the time.

Bicycles
Riffard was involved in the design of at least two aerodynamic bicycle projects.

Vélo-Torpille
 
Étienne Bunau-Varilla was the son of a French engineer who had become wealthy working on the abortive French Panama Canal project. After completing his Baccalauréat, the younger Bunau-Varilla was given an airplane as a gift, and participated in some air races. He later started racing bicycles, and was the originator of the Vélo-Torpille (Torpedo bike). Work on the project started in 1910.

Riffard designed a narrow, tapering dirigible-shaped fairing made of wood and celluloid for the bike that covered the rider's entire body except for his lower legs. The completed assembly weighed 

The shape of the bike and fairing earned it the nickname ""l'Oeuf de Berthet" — Berthet's egg. Marcel Berthet was a cyclist who had held several world kilometre records, and he would be in the bike for its record attempts.

In 1913 Berthet covered one kilometre in 1 minute 04 seconds at the Parc des Princes stadium in the Vélo-Torpille. Later at the Vélodrome d'Hiver he reduced his time to 1 minute 02 seconds, setting a new Union Cycliste Internationale (UCI) record. The UCI refuses to recognize the feat because the bike has Riffard's fairing.

Vélodyne
 
Riffard helped design another fairing-covered bicycle called the Vélodyne that was a project of just Riffard and Berthet.

This cycle had a reversed front fork holding a wheel smaller than the rear. The metal frame was made of aluminum, while the fairing was of spruce and magnolia wood covered in canvas. The fairing, which extended almost to the ground, opened on the side to admit the rider. Fabrication was done by the Caudron Aircraft Company.

On 9 September 1933, Berthet covered  in one hour at the Parc des Princes, beating the standing record. Neither of these forays were recognized by the UCI.

Automobiles
Riffard contributed to the designs of several automobiles, including at least one production sports car, several endurance racers, and some land speed record attempt cars.

Renault Rafale
Riffard contributed to the design of a concept car called the Renault Rafale. Unveiled in 1934, this car was the precursor to the Renault Vivastella Grand Sport launched the same year.

Renault Viva Grand Sport 
 
In 1934 Renault debuted their Vivastella Grand Sport, with a body designed by Riffard. The car was renamed the Renault Viva Grand Sport the next year. Riffard applied his experience designing streamlined aircraft to produce the car's body shape. The car debuted at the 1934 Salon de Paris, alongside the Nervastella, and was built by Renault between 1934 and 1939. At , the car is wide enough to seat three people abreast. It is powered by an inline six-cylinder engine displacing , mounted lengthwise at the front.

Renault hired record holder and celebrity aviatrix Hélène Boucher to promote the Viva Grand Sport.

Nervasport des Records
 
About six years after setting land speed records with its streamlined Type NM 40CV single-seater, Renault once again decided to pursue new land speed records, initially with a tuned Nervastella at Monthléry in March 1932.

For the next attempt Renault commissioned l'atelier 153, a dedicated workshop within Renault under the direction of Auguste Riolfo that handled testing new models and special projects, to build a dedicated land speed racer.

The car was based on a standard Nervasport chassis, but with a custom body designed by Riffard and made of hand-hammered metal supported by a wooden framework. The single seater had an enclosed cockpit with a flat windscreen. The roofline angled slightly downwards behind the driver, and narrowed into a fin-like shape.

The record car used the  flathead straight-8 engine from the production Nervasport, which produced , mated to a 3-speed manual transmission.

The drivers selected for the run were Roger Quatresous, Léo Fromentin, André Wagner, and Georges Berthelon, who also served as garage manager. Each driver rotated in three hour shifts.

The record attempt started at Monthléry on 3 April 1934 at 3:37 pm, and continued until just before 4:00 pm, 5 April 1934. New average speed records were also set for  distances.

On the eightieth anniversary of the Nervasport's record breaking run, and in advance of their 110th anniversary of motorsports activity, Renault commissioned a replica of the 1934 Nervasport des Records be built. The first sketches of the car were done in 2014, and the completed replica debuted on the Montlhérey circuit in June 2016.

Vivasport des Records
The records set by the Nervasport des Records did not stand long. Renault's response was to build a new land speed car.

The new car's bodywork was once again designed by Riffard, and construction handled by l'atelier 153. This car was based on the chassis of a Renault Vivasport, and used that model's  inline six-cylinder engine. Its long nose and ovoid front air intake were reminiscent of the Nervasport car, but the canopy over the driver reflected Riffard's aviation background, with a wrap-around windscreen and a roofline that dropped down much more sharply than the roofline of the Nervasport des Records, with no fin.

The car began its record attempt on 13 August 1934. At 7:45 pm Quatresous took the first shift, and was replaced by Fromentin at 10:45 pm, and then Berthelon at 1:45 am. At 3:30 am there was an accident that resulted in the car being destroyed in an explosion and subsequent fire, while Berthelon was thrown out of the car to his death.

Autobleu 750 Mille Miles

For the 1954 Mille Miglia the Autobleu company produced its only works racing car; the model 750 Mille Miles (MM). The engine was tuned by Porsche, and developed . The streamlined developed by Riffard was built by Carrosserie G.T.R. In the 1954 race it was driven by Jean Sigrand and Jean Bianchi, and went out due to an accident. It was entered in the 1955 Mille Miglia, but it is unclear whether it raced. It then ran in the 1956 12 Hours of Reims. Driven by Lucien Bianchi and Christian Poirot, it finished eleventh in class, and twenty-first overall.

Renault-Riffard
The Autobleu 750 MM was preceded by an earlier Riffard design for a car called the Renault-Riffard Tank. Built on the chassis of an existing race car called the Guépard some time between 1950 and 1954, this compact barquette had full-width "tank" style bodywork with the side profile of an airfoil cross-section. The bodywork was designed by Riffard and fabricated by Heuliez. Both engine and transmission had been moved to the front of the chassis.

Panhard X cars
In 1953 Panhard decided to become directly involved in racing. Paul Panhard established a racing team under director Etienne de Valance. During World War II (WWII), René Panhard had flown fighter planes from Caudron-Renault, and he contacted Riffard to design their new endurance racers. Riffard produced designs for two of three of Panhard's own endurance racers; the X88, and X89. As there were no corresponding Dyna X series X88 or X89, these designations were specific to the racing cars built by Panhard.

Panhard X88 
Riffard's original 1953 Le Mans barquette bodywork was wide and low, with a flat tapering tail. The car's chassis was of light alloy, with bodywork of Duralinox. The passenger compartment was faired in except for an opening for the driver, with a raised headrest as part of the bodywork behind his seat. At the front, the leading edges of the fenders projected forward, and during some events were capped by conspicuous forward-facing conical covers. The first X88 was powered by a  Panhard twin. The body of the X88 would be revised more than once, first to a more traditional sportscar style with exposed headlamps, then to a smooth curving nose with covered lamps.

Panhard X89
The original bodywork for the 1953 Le Mans car was similar in appearance to that of the X88 and was also of Duralinox. The X89, however, was powered by the larger  Panhard twin. And like the X88, the X89's body would later be revised, with at least one car being bodied as a closed berlinette with a smooth curving nose. 

Panhard's next racing car, the VM5, was designed by engineer Pierre Durand. After the accident at Le Mans in 1955, Panhard withdrew from direct racing involvement, and Monopole became Panhard's officially supported racing team. The cars were transferred to Écurie Monopole and raced as Panhard-Monopoles.

Personal life and death
On 6 November 1916, after a seven year engagement, Riffard married. The couple had three sons.

Riffard died at Versailles in the Yvelines on 9 July 1981 and is buried in Chaville in the Hauts-de-Seine.

Honours 
  Croix de Guerre 1914–1918
  Officier de la Légion d'honneur
  Commandeur de l'ordre national du Mérite
 1956 recipient of La grande médaille de l’Aéro-Club de France
 Riffard and his work were memorialized in a series of murals painted at the Gare de Chaville.

References

Further reading 
 
 Rétroviseur N°363, février 2020

See also 
 Hélène Boucher

External links

1886 births
1981 deaths
French aerospace engineers
Commanders of the Ordre national du Mérite
Officiers of the Légion d'honneur
Recipients of the Croix de Guerre (France)
People from Santa Fe, Argentina